St Augustine of Canterbury School may refer to:

St Augustine of Canterbury Catholic Primary School (Gillingham, Kent), England
The St Augustine of Canterbury School, Taunton, England

See also
St Augustine of Canterbury Catholic Academy
St. Augustine High School (disambiguation)